Lejre Municipality is a municipality in Region Zealand.

The current municipality was established on 1 January 2007 as a result of Kommunalreformen ("The Municipal Reform" of 2007), merging the former Lejre Municipality with Bramsnæs Municipality and Hvalsø Municipality to form a new Lejre Municipality.
28 September 2016 Carsten Rasmussen took over as mayor from Mette Touborg, who was leaving for a new job. She had been the mayor since 1 January 2010. She was the only one from the left wing Socialist People's Party to hold the highest political position in a municipality, whereas he is from the Social Democrats.

Local companies include the chocolate manufacturer Friis-Holm.

Settlements 
The municipality consists of the following settlements (populations as of 2011):

and
 Bramsnæs 
 Øm (village)

Politics

Municipal council
Lejre's municipal council consists of 25 members, elected every four years. Below are the municipal councils elected since the Municipal Reform of 2007.

Notable people 
 Ole Søndergaard (1876 in Allerslev – 1958) a Danish landscape painter
 Jørgen Jørgensen (1888 in Kornerup – 1974) a Danish politician and party leader
 Karen Strand (1924 in Kirke Hyllinge – 2000) a Danish goldsmith and jewellery designer
 Patricia Crone (1945  in Kyndeløse – 2015) a Danish-American author, Orientalist and historian specializing in early Islamic history

Notes

References 
 Municipal statistics: NetBorger Kommunefakta, delivered from KMD aka Kommunedata (Municipal Data)
 Municipal mergers and neighbors: Eniro new municipalities map

External links 

 Municipality's official website
 The new Lejre Municipality's official website (Danish only)

 
Municipalities of Region Zealand
Municipalities of Denmark
Populated places established in 2007